The Women event of the FIBT World Championships 2015 was held on 6–7 March 2015.

Results
The first two runs were started on 6 March at 11:00 and the last two runs on 7 March at 10:00.

References

Women